Marie-Angéline Colson (born 21 May 1976) is a French gymnast. She competed in six events at the 1992 Summer Olympics.

References

1976 births
Living people
French female artistic gymnasts
Olympic gymnasts of France
Gymnasts at the 1992 Summer Olympics
Sportspeople from Clermont-Ferrand
20th-century French women